Andrew Edward Strenk (born July 7, 1949) is an American former competition swimmer and Pan American Games medalist.

Strenk represented the United States at the 1968 Summer Olympics in Mexico City.  He swam for the gold medal-winning U.S. team in the preliminary heats of the men's 4×200-meter freestyle relay.  He did not receive a medal, however; under the 1968 international swimming rules, only those relay swimmers who swam in the event final were eligible to receive a medal.

Prior to the 1968 Olympics, Strenk was a member of the U.S. national team assembled for the 1967 Pan American Games in Winnipeg, Canada, where he won a bronze medal in the men's 1,500-meter freestyle with a time of 17:03.43.  After the Olympics, he was a gold medalist in the men's 400-meter freestyle, 1,500-meter freestyle, and 4×200-meter freestyle relay at the 1970 World University Games held in Turin, Italy.

Strenk attended the University of Southern California, where he swam for the USC Trojans swimming and diving team.  He graduated from Southern Cal with his bachelor's degree and Phi Beta Kappa honors in 1971, and earned a master's degree from the University of Würzburg in 1975.  He later returned to Southern Cal and completed his doctorate in European history, and served as a lecturer at his alma mater.

Strenk has lectured and written on the impact of international sports on politics and international relations.  He served as the historian of the Los Angeles Olympic Organizing Committee for the 1984 Summer Olympics.  He now works as an international business and development consultant and is a principal in Strategic Planning Concepts International.

See also

 List of University of Southern California people

References

External links
 

1949 births
Living people
American male freestyle swimmers
Olympic swimmers of the United States
Pan American Games bronze medalists for the United States
Swimmers from Philadelphia
Swimmers at the 1967 Pan American Games
Swimmers at the 1968 Summer Olympics
University of Southern California faculty
USC Trojans men's swimmers
Pan American Games medalists in swimming
Universiade medalists in swimming
Universiade gold medalists for the United States
Universiade silver medalists for the United States
Medalists at the 1967 Summer Universiade
Medalists at the 1970 Summer Universiade
Medalists at the 1967 Pan American Games